Engineering Red is a Russian surrealist film directed by Andrey Yi and animator Armen Petrosyan.

The script is based on Thomas Mann's novel The Magic Mountain (1924) and idea of creating artificial people in the Soviet Union (in the 1940-1950s).

Plot 
The film is divided into three chapters and has two storylines – documentary and fiction.

The fictional part of the film consists of psychedelic scenes: a red room, a girl in red silk, kaleidoscopic images. A female voice-over reads an excerpt from The Magic Mountain, in which the thoughts of a deceased soldier are heard (his consciousness is still in a dead body) sounding his reflections on Christ, the Apostles and the Bible. The soldier's body then falls prey to necrophilic children.

The documentary part tells about medicine, like  pig heart transplant, cadaveric blood transfusion, story of conjoined twins etc.

History of creation

References 

1993 films
1990s Russian-language films
1993 documentary films
1990s mockumentary films
Russian documentary films